The 2018 Castle Point Borough Council election took place on 3 May 2018 to elect members of Castle Point Borough Council in England.

Results summary

Ward results
Results from all wards are listed below:

Appleton

Boyce

Canvey Island Central

No UKIP (-28.0) or Liberal Democrat (-1.4) candidates as previous.

Canvey Island East

No UKIP candidate as previous (-34.9).

Canvey Island North

No UKIP candidate as previous (-33.7).

Canvey Island South

No UKIP candidate as previous (-26.6).

Canvey Island West

Canvey Island Winter Gardens

Cedar Hall

St. George's

St. James'

No UKIP candidate as previous (-26.5).

St. Mary's

St. Peter's

Victoria

No UKIP candidate as previous (-27.0).

References

Castle Point Borough Council elections
2018 English local elections